Bacopa eisenii is a species of water hyssop known by the common name Gila River water hyssop. It is native to California and Nevada, where it grows in wet habitat such as rice paddies and muddy river banks. This aquatic plant has rounded or oval leaves 1 to 3 centimeters long with several longitudinal veins. The flower appears on a stout pedicel; it is white with a bright golden throat. The fruit is a capsule containing many seeds.

External links
Jepson Manual Treatment
Photo gallery

Plantaginaceae
Freshwater plants
Flora of California
Flora of Nevada
Flora without expected TNC conservation status